Mrkos may refer to:
 Antonín Mrkos (1918, Střemchoví, Dolní Loučky - 1996), a Czech astronomer
 143P/Kowal-Mrkos, a periodic comet
 18D/Perrine-Mrkos, a periodic comet
 1832 Mrkos (provisional designation 1969 PC), an outer main belt asteroid discovered in 1969 by L. Chernykh
 45P/Honda-Mrkos-Pajdušáková, a periodic comet discovered on 1948
 Comet Mrkos (disambiguation)

Czech-language surnames